Mormogystia reibellii is a moth in the family Cossidae. It is found in North Africa and the northern part of the Arabian Peninsula, including the northern part of Saudi Arabia, northern Oman, the United Arab Emirates, Israel, Egypt, Algeria, Libya, Tunisia, Mauritania, Niger and Chad.

The wingspan is 27–31 mm. The ground colour of the forewings is light ochre. The head, thorax and abdomen are light yellow.

References

Moths described in 1876
Cossinae